Davarzan County is in Razavi Khorasan province, Iran. The capital of the county is the city of Davarzan. At the 2006 census, the region's population (as Davarzan District of Sabzevar County) was 22,406 in 6,763 households. The following census in 2011 counted 21,309 people in 7,154 households. It was separated from Sabzevar County on 15 May 2012. At the 2016 census, the county's population was 21,911 in 7,678 households.

Administrative divisions

The population history and structural changes of Davarzan County's administrative divisions over three consecutive censuses are shown in the following table. The latest census shows two districts, four rural districts, and one city.

References

 

Counties of Razavi Khorasan Province